Stane Derganc (23 April 1893 – 9 August 1981) was a Yugoslav gymnast. At the 1928 Olympics, he won two bronze medals for the Kingdom of Serbs, Croats and Slovenes (one with team). Today, he is also remembered as the model for the man depicted on the Verigar stamps, the first stamp series in Slovene.

Stane Derganc was born in Ljubljana. He took part in two Olympic Games for Yugoslavia, and two gymnastics World Championships. At the 1924 Olympics in Paris, he came in fourth place in the individual combined event, and fifth in the floor event, and seventh in the pommel horse were his best results in the individual apparatus. At the next event, in 1928 he took bronze in the team event and individual floor event.

At the World Championships, he won many medals. At his first World Championships, in 1922 in Yugoslavia, he was part of the Yugoslav team which took silver in the team event, behind Czechoslovakia. He also took bronze in the individual overall event, and silver in the horizontal bar. He also took part in the next World Championships, in Lyon, France in 1926. There, Yugoslavia again won silver in the team event. He won no individual medals at this World Championships.

Gallery

Stane Derganc was depicted by Ivan Vavpotič on the Verigar stamps from late 1918:

References

External links

1893 births
1981 deaths
Slovenian male artistic gymnasts
Yugoslav male artistic gymnasts
Olympic gymnasts of Yugoslavia
Olympic bronze medalists for Yugoslavia
Gymnasts at the 1924 Summer Olympics
Gymnasts at the 1928 Summer Olympics
Sportspeople from Ljubljana
Carniolan people
Olympic medalists in gymnastics
Medalists at the 1928 Summer Olympics